A toy fort is a miniature fortress or castle that is used as a setting to stage battles using toy soldiers. Toy forts come in many shapes and sizes; some are copies of existing historical structures, while others are imagined with specific elements to enable realistic play, such as moats, drawbridges, and battlements. Toy fort designs range from the châteaux of Europe to the stockade forts of the American wild west.

History 
Toy forts and castles first appeared at the beginning of the nineteenth century in Germany, a country that dominated the world of toy manufacturing up until WW1. The earliest examples came as a set of generic wooden blocks which could be configured in many different ways. As time went on, some of these sets were designed to portray specific structures associated with real battles.

Around 1850 dollhouse manufacturers started to apply their production methods and capabilities towards the production of toy forts and castles. Sets would consist of wooden components, some blocks and some flat, painted to depict details such as stone, brick, windows, arches and vegetation. The parts would be shipped in a box which was designed to be inverted and then used as the base for the toy fort. This design became the standard design for toy forts and castles for the next 100 years.

The Germans dominated the toy fort market until about 1900 when other manufacturers from France, Denmark, Britain, and the USA started to appear on the scene. As technology progressed, new materials were used in the manufacturing of toy forts including tin, zinc alloy, composition, cardboard, hardboard, MDF, and finally plastics.

Manufacturers 
The three best-known manufacturers of toy forts were Moritz Gottschalk (Germany), O. and M. Hausser (Germany), and Lines Bros. (Great Britain).

Germany 
 Christian Hacker
 Moritz Gottschalk (1840—1905) started his career as a bookbinder, but by the age of 25 had branched off into children's toys which would eventually lead to him becoming one of the world's most influential toy makers of the late 19th to early 20th centuries. He started with the dollhouses that he is most famous for and quickly went from a cottage industry to running a factory. Once his infrastructure was in place he was able to diversify adding the manufacture of other toy buildings such as forts, stables, and grocery stores to his repertoire.
 Dr. F.A. Richter
 Emil Schubert
 The Hausser Brothers
 Carl Moritz Reichel
 Emil Weise and Carl Krause
 Richter and Wittich

Great Britain 
 Lines Bros./Tri-ang. Toy manufacturer Richard Lines, in partnership with his brother George, ran the company G & J Lines until 1903 when he bought out his brother and continued to make toys with the help of his four sons. In 1919 three of the sons, Walter, Arthur, and William formed the company Lines Bros. Ltd which used the brand name Triangle Toys, later shortened to Tri-ang. The company's toy forts first hit the toy market around 1931. 
 C.E.Turnbull/Charterhouse
 Chad Valley
 A.J.Holladay/Skybird
 Burnett & Co/UBILDA
 Binbak
 Elf (Joy Toys)
 Tudor Toys
 Britains

Spain 
 Reamsa

Belgium

Denmark

Materials

Further reading 
 Hickling, Allen (2015).Toy Forts and Castles: European-Made Toys of the 19th & 20th Centuries. Atglen, PA: Schiffer Publishing Ltd. . OCLC 898088145
 Hickling, Allen (2001). "From Dollhouse to Fortress: The Military Aspect of Moritz Gottschalk's Toy World, Part 1". Old Toy Soldier. Oak Park, IL, USA. 25 (1)
 Köhler, Swantje (2009). Christian Hacker. Wooden Toy Company in Nuremberg 1835-1927. München.

References

External links 
 Allen Hickling

Scale modeling
Toy collecting
Traditional toys
Wooden toys
Toy companies of the United Kingdom
Playscale miniaturism